969 (formally called MTV Select or Select) was a one-hour lifestyle magazine show.  It was produced from the Citytv building in Vancouver, British Columbia. The show was hosted by Malaika Jackson, Joel Herrod, Chris Van Vliet and Lauren Toyota.  It features interviews with bands, celebrities and professional athletes. It also showcased the latest in youth fashion and gives reviews of the hottest video games and movies. Viewers were able to make requests to see music videos through the show's website.  The show was officially canceled in summer of 2007.  Repeats ran daily on Razer until it was rebranded as MTV2 in August, 2008.

Cast
Catherine Petersen: Supervising Producer
Joey Case: Senior Producer
Brian Adler: Host, Producer
Briana McIvor: Production Assistant
Mia Jagpal: Production Assistant
Malaika Jackson: Host, Producer
Jason Jag Arneja: Host, Associate Producer
Jay Ward: Production Editor
Kimberley Dainard: Production Editor
Dee Hambly: Photojournalist
Adam Haisinger: Photojournalist
Chris Van Vliet: Host, Photojournalist
Lauren Toyota: Host, Producer
Jessica Reddy: Host, Producer
Joel Herrod: Host, Producer
Andrew Worrall: Junior Associate Producer
CJ Wallis: Junior Associate Producer
Tyler Bradley: Host
Matt Leaf: ENG Camera
John Wilson: Camera Operator
Ayma Letang: Makeup Artist
Aaron Johnston: Makeup Artist
Dakota Morton: Assistant Editor

Past Guests

AFI
Alexisonfire
The All-American Rejects
Anti-Flag
Arctic Monkeys
Audioslave
Lloyd Banks
Bedouin Soundclash
Belly
Billy Talent
Black Maria
Frank Black
Blue October
James Blunt
Divine Brown
Buck 65
Buckcherry
Cancer Bats
Chamillionaire
Champion
Keshia Chanté
Chingy
Choclair
City and Colour
David Copperfield
Matt Costa
Cuff the Duke
The Dandy Warhols
The Dears
Death Cab for Cutie
Default
Fefe Dobson
Snoop Dogg
Hilary Duff
Eagles of Death Metal
Evanescence
Fall Out Boy
Finger Eleven
Five for Fighting
Foo Fighters
Donavon Frankenreiter
Franz Ferdinand
The Fray
Nelly Furtado
The Futureheads
G. Love
G-Unit
The Game
Teddy Geiger
George
Rex Goudie
Matthew Good
David Gray
Dallas Green
Tom Green
Gym Class Heroes

Ben Harper
Hawthorne Heights
Hinder
Hot Hot Heat
Howie D
Hurst
Idle Sons
INXS
Jacks Mannequin
Jelleestone
Jimmy Eat World
Jurassic 5
K'naan
k-os
Kardinal Offishall
Karl Wolf
Kasabian
Keane
Mat Kearney
The Killers
Jordan Knight
Korn
Carson Kressley
Lady Sovereign
Ben Lee
Sean Lennon
Less Than Jake
Juliette Lewis and the Licks
Lillix
Live
The Magic Numbers
Magneta Lane
The Marble Index
Marianas Trench
Ziggy Marley
Massari
Matt Mays
The Meligrove Band
Mobile
Moneen
Jason Mraz
My Chemical Romance
Bif Naked
Neverending White Lights
The New Pornographers
Nickelback
Nine Inch Nails
NOFX
Melissa O'Neil
Paul Oakenfold
Oliver Black
Operation M.D.
Our Lady Peace
Panic! at the Disco
The Philosopher Kings
Pilate
The Pink Spiders
Pocket Dwellers
Protest the Hero

Queens of the Stone Age
Red Jumpsuit Apparatus
The Rentals
Rise Against
Sam Roberts
Lukas Rossi
Saukrates
Seether
Joey Shithead
Simple Plan
Sloan
Snow Patrol
Stabilo
Scott Stapp
The Stills
Stone Sour
Story of the Year
The Strokes
Switchfoot
Swollen Members
TV on the Radio
Ten Second Epic
Theory of a Deadman
Three Days Grace
Thursday
Train
The Trews
Underoath
Vincent Black Shadow
We Are Scientists
Wide Mouth Mason
Wolfmother
Yellowcard

See also
 Razer
 MTV Select

External links
 969 on Razer
 969 Myspace page
 Watch 969 on Much AXS

2000s Canadian variety television series
2004 Canadian television series debuts
2007 Canadian television series endings
2000s Canadian music television series